Strengthen the Arm of Liberty is the theme of the Boy Scouts of America's fortieth anniversary celebration in 1950. The campaign was inaugurated in February with a dramatic ceremony held at the base of the Statue of Liberty (Liberty Enlightening the World). Approximately 200 BSA Statue of Liberty replicas were installed across the United States.

Replicas

As part of the Strengthening the Arm of Liberty campaign to commemorate the 40th anniversary of the Boy Scouts of America (BSA), hundreds of scale replicas of the Statue of Liberty have been created nationwide. The Statue of Liberty, by French sculptor Frédéric Auguste Bartholdi, bears the classical appearance of the Roman stola, sandals, and facial expression which are derived from Libertas, ancient Rome's goddess of freedom from slavery, oppression, and tyranny. Her raised right foot is on the move. This symbol of Liberty and Freedom is not standing still or at attention in the harbor, but moving forward, as her left foot tramples broken shackles at her feet, in symbolism of the United States's wish to be free from oppression and tyranny.

Manufacture
Between 1949 and 1952, approximately two hundred  replicas of the statue, made of stamped copper, were purchased by Boy Scout troops and donated in 39 states in the U.S. and several of its possessions and territories. The project was the brainchild of Kansas City businessman, J.P. Whitaker, who was then Scout Commissioner of the Kansas City Area Council.

The copper statues were manufactured by Friedley-Voshardt Co. (Chicago, Illinois) and purchased through the Kansas City Boy Scout office. The mass-produced statues are not meticulously accurate and a conservator noted that "her face isn't as mature as the real Liberty. It's rounder and more like a little girl's."

Present
Many of these statues have been lost or destroyed, but preservationists have been able to account for about 100 of them, and BSA Troop 101 of Cheyenne, Wyoming has collected photographs of more than 100 of them.

Statues include Birmingham, Alabama, Fayetteville, Arkansas, Pine Bluff, Arkansas, Greeley, Colorado, at the Mississippi riverfront in Burlington, Iowa, at Overland Park, Kansas, and at Chimborazo Park in Richmond, Virginia.

The copper skins can oxidize, resembling the original, and some have been renovated. The statue in Burlington had been taken from its original position in Dankwardt Park, completely renovated, repaired, and polished, and then placed on a pedestal at the riverfront, where it sits today.

List of BSA Statue of Liberty replicas

The following is a list of locations of the replica statues .

Alabama
Birmingham - Linn Park, located on the west side of the Jefferson County Courthouse building facing Linn Park; the replica at Liberty Park is not a BSA piece

Arkansas

 Fayetteville, Washington Regional Medical Center, North Hills Blvd
 Pine Bluff, 10th Avenue between Georgia & State Streets on Esplanade opposite South Side Civic Center
 Sherwood, Amy Sanders Branch Library, 31 Shelby Road

California
 Bellflower, John Simms Park, 16601 South Clark Avenue

Colorado

 Colorado Springs, Old City Hall, 107 North Nevada Avenue
 Denver, Missing
 Estes Park, Park Elementary School, Community Dr. and Graves Avenue
 Fort Collins,  Ben Delatour Ranch for Boy Scouts
 Greeley, Corner of 9th Street and 9th Avenue
 Gunnison, Leslie J. Savage Library at Western State College of Colorado, 600 N. Adams, north wall of the main floor. Originally in Crawford
  Johnstown, Letford Elementary School, Charlotte and Jay Avenues
 Kremmling, South side of Town Square
 La Junta, City Park, 10th St. and Colorado Avenue
 Longmont, Roosevelt Park, Coffman Street and Longs Peak Avenue
 Loveland, Lakeside Park, Colorado Route 34, Eisenhower Street
 Pueblo, Pueblo County Courthouse, Court Street and 10th Street
 Sterling, Logan County Courthouse
 Trinidad, County Courthouse, First Street and Maple Street
 Walsh, Santa Fe, Nevada St
 Ward, Camp Tahosa

Florida
 Orlando, Magnolia and Orange Avenue
 Quincy, Wallwood Scout Reservation, 23 Wallwood BSA Drive

Georgia

 Atlanta, Georgia State Capitol, Northwest corner of Capitol grounds. Corner of Washington Street and Martin Luther King Drive
 Rome, at Camp Sidney Dew

Guam

Hagatna Harbor, Guam

Idaho
 Caldwell, Caldwell Memorial Park, Near Grant Street

Illinois
 London Mills, Village Veteran Park
 Warsaw, Rolston Park
 Benton in front of the library
 Oregon Camp Lowden, BSA

Indiana
 Dupont, Camp Louis Ernst, BSA, 75 feet west of Indiana SR 7
 Gary, 401 Broadway, City Hall
 Madison, Jefferson County Courthouse, Northwest corner
 Peru, Miami County Courthouse, Courthouse square, south side
 Plymouth, Marshall County Commissioners, Marshall County Courthouse
 South Bend, Old Courthouse, 101 South Main Street

Iowa

 Bloomfield, Courthouse
 Burlington, on the banks of the Mississippi River
 Cedar Falls, Veterans Memorial Park
 Cedar Rapids, 1st Ave Bridge, south tip of Ellis Island
 Clarence, City Park
 Clinton, Eagle Point Park
 Decorah, Decorah Courthouse, 201 West Main
 Des Moines, Iowa State Capitol, East 12th Street
 Dubuque, Between West 6th and 7th
 Fairfield, in front of Jefferson County Courthouse
 Fort Madison, Central Park, Corner of 9th Street & Ave F
 Grundy Center, Grundy Courthouse Square
 Independence, Independence Courthouse, 331 1st Street East
 Iowa City, Campus of City High School
 Leon, Courthouse, North Main Street, town square
 Mason City, Central Park
 Manly, Central Park
 Mount Pleasant, North West Corner of the Henry County Court House
 Muscatine, in front of City Hall, 215 Sycamore Street
 Sioux City, Sioux City Municipal Auditorium
 Waterloo, Soldiers and Sailors Park
 Waverly, Bremer County Courthouse, Highway 3, Waverly and Bremer Avenue
 West Liberty, in front of the City Hall
 West Point, Center of Town Square
 Woodbine, in front of the library

Kansas

 Coffeyville, in front of the high school
 Colby, Fike Park, Corner of Franklin and East 8th Street
 Eldorado, Butler County Historical Society Museum
 Garden City, Finney County Courthouse, 8th Street side
 Garnett, Courthouse Square
 Harlan, Roadside Park, US 281, 5 miles from Harlan
 Hays, Hays Public Library, 1205 Main
 Hillsboro, Hillsboro Memorial Park, Birch Street
 Independence, Penn and Locust
 Kingman, Kingman Elementary and Junior High School, North Main Street
 La Crosse, La Crosse City Park, South Main Street
 Leavenworth, City Hall, Lawn, northeast corner of 5th and Shawnee
 Lebanon, Kansas Geographical center of the lower 48 states
 Liberal, Liberal Memorial Library, 519 North Kansas
 Medicine Lodge, Medicine Lodge Grade School, 320 North Walnut, Northwest corner
 Overland Park, Shawnee Mission North High School, 7401 Johnson Drive
 Parsons, Parsons Middle School, Southwest corner, 28th and Main
 Pratt, Gateway Park, Corner of East First and Stout
 Russell, Lincoln Park, Corner of 4th and Lincoln Streets
 St. John, City Park Square, Northeast corner, 4th and Broadway
 Salina, Oakdale Park, 320 East Ash
 Smith County, located in small park overlooking the North Fork of the Solomon River Valley just west of U.S. 281
 Topeka, Kansas State Capitol grounds
 Troy, Doniphan County Courthouse, Southwest grounds
 Washington, Washington County Courthouse, C Street and 3rd
 Wichita, Roosevelt Middle School, 2100 East Douglas

Kentucky
Leitchfield, Grayson County Courthouse

Massachusetts
 Fall River, John F. Kennedy Park, Corner of Bradford and Broadway Avenue
  Lawrence, Lawrence Public Library

Michigan

 Mackinac Island, Mackinac Island Marina

Minnesota
  Hibbing, City Hall, 401 East 21st Street

Mississippi
Columbus, located on Main Street

Missouri

 Boonville, Cooper County Courthouse, Main Street, In front of Courthouse
 Butler, Butler Grade School
 Cape Girardeau, Intersection of Broadway and West End Boulevard
 Columbia, Formerly located Municipal Building, 505 West Broadway (1950–73)
 Concordia, Central Park, Seventh Street at Gordon Street
 Jefferson City, Missouri State Capitol, Capitol and Jefferson Streets, west of Department of Highway and Transportation building
 Kansas City, Meyer Boulevard and Prospect Avenue
 Kansas City, North Kansas City High School, Circular promenade near Iron, Howell, and East 23rd Streets
 Lamar, SE corner of Courthouse lawn
 Lexington, County Court House, 1001 Main Street
 Liberty, Franklin Elementary School, 201 West Mill Street
 Malden, Intersection of Business Highway 25 and Downing Street
 Marshall, Indian Foothills Park, North entrance
 Memphis, County Courthouse, Corner of Monroe and Market Streets
 Mexico, Audrain County Courthouse
 North Kansas City, North Kansas City High School, Circular promenade near Iron, Howell, and East 23rd Streets
 Memphis, Scotland County Courthouse, Corner of Monroe and Market Streets
 Osceola, H. Roe Bartle Scout Reservation
 St. Joseph, Smith Park, Francis between 11th and 12th
 Salisbury, City Park
 Sedalia, Pettis County Courthouse
 Silva,  Lewallen Scout Camp
 Slater, SE corner of Elm St.
 Springfield, in front of County Courthouse

Montana
 Great Falls, Gibson Park, Park Drive and 2nd Avenue North
 Lewistown, Prospect and Main Streets

Nebraska
 Alma, in front of the courthouse 
 Columbus, Pawnee Park, 33rd Avenue
 Falls City, Court House, 17th and Stone St.
 Fremont, Masonic Park, 77 and Highway 30
 Gering, U and 10th
 Grand Island, Pier Park
 Hastings, 12th Street
  Lincoln, Antelope Park
 Norfolk, Central Park, 510 Pasewalk Avenue
 Scottsbluff, 10th and North 27th Street
 David City, City park main entrance. Hwy 15

Nevada
 Las Vegas, New York-New York Hotel and Casino

New York
 Hudson, Intersection of Columbia and Green Street
 Le Roy, Wolcott Street, Opposite Woodward Memorial Library
 Niagara Falls, Rainbow Bridge Plaza
 Oneonta, Neawha Park
 Schenectady, Intersection of Erie Boulevard and Union Street
 Utica, Median between Elm Street and Pleasant Street

North Carolina
  Wilmington, Thalian Hall, Front lawn, northeast corner of Third and Princess Streets

North Dakota
 Fargo, Main and 2nd Streets

Ohio
Camp Miakonda, Sylvania(Toledo)

Oklahoma

 Blackwell, Memorial Swimming Pool, 1400 South Main Street
 Chickasha, Shannon Springs Park, part the Grady County Veterans Memorial, southeast of W Montana Ave and S 12th Street 
 Cushing, City Park, 900 block of South Little Street
 Edmond, Edmond Historical Society and Museum, 431 South Boulevard
 Enid, Garfield County Courthouse, Grand and Broadway Streets
 Lindsay, north Main St.
 Miami, Ottawa County Courthouse, corner of A Street and Central S.E.
 Muskogee, Spaulding Park, Spaulding Park Lake
 Oklahoma City, Oklahoma County Courthouse, near corner of Park and Hudson (Statue of Liberty)
 Tahlequah, Cherokee Nation Capitol, corner of Keetoowah and Muskogee
 Tulsa, Northwest corner of the Sidney Lanier grade school property, located on Harvard Avenue between 17th and 19th streets
 Wewoka, Seminole County Courthouse, 100 block of Wewoka Avenue

Oregon
 Medford, corner of South Oakdale Avenue and West 8th Street

Pennsylvania
 Berwick, Borough Hall, Market Street
 Bloomsburg, Bloomsburg Memorial Elementary School, West 5th and South Market Streets
 Ellwood City, Lincoln High School, 5th and Crescent Avenue
  New Castle, Owen Penfield Fox Park, Mill and Grove Streets
 York, Kiwanis Park, North Newberry Street and Parkway Boulevard, on island in lake

South Carolina
 Columbia, Realtors Park, Intersection of Barnwell, Blossom and Devine Streets

Texas
  Big Spring, Texas, City Hall, Southwest corner of Third & Nolan Street
  Dallas, Fair Park, North side of Hall of State
 Midland, Midland County Courthouse, 200 West Wall Street
 Port Arthur, Lions Park
 Statue of Liberty Replica Monument, Texas State Capitol, Austin, Texas

Virginia
 Richmond, Chimborazo Park

Washington

 Statue of Liberty (Seattle), Alki Point

West Virginia
 Fairmont, Veterans of Foreign Wars Post 629, 802 Fairmont Ave

Wisconsin
 Kenosha, inside Kenosha History museum on Simmon's Island
 Madison, Warner Park, Corner of Northport and Sherman Avenue

Wyoming
 Torrington, Goshen County Courthouse, N.E. corner of 21st Avenue and East A Street
 Wheatland, Platte County Courthouse, 800 9th Street
 Cheyenne, Lions Park

Artifacts
A Strengthen the Arm of Liberty brass pin was produced for uniform and civilian wear. The pin is in the shape of the Statue of Liberty superimposed on a fleur de lis. The Robbins Company, which made BSA's Eagle medals for many years, made these pins and the winged "R" hallmark is prominently displayed on the reverse. A commemorative neckerchief slide was made for Boy Scouts and for the Cub Scouts.

See also

 Replicas of the Statue of Liberty
 Scouting museums
 Scouting memorials

Notes

References

External links

Replica Statue of Liberty Search

Replicas of the Statue of Liberty
Boy Scouts of America
Scouting monuments and memorials